Dawn Josephs (born 26 February 1932) is a Canadian athlete. She competed in the women's long jump and the women's high jump at the 1952 Summer Olympics.

References

1932 births
Living people
Athletes (track and field) at the 1952 Summer Olympics
Canadian female long jumpers
Canadian female high jumpers
Olympic track and field athletes of Canada
Athletes from Victoria, British Columbia